The endemic species of Taiwan are organisms that are endemic to the island of Taiwan— that is, they occur nowhere else on Earth.

Percentages of endemic animals of all living species in Taiwan.

Percentages of endemic plants of all living species in Taiwan.

Endemic fauna

Endemic mammals

Order: Carnivora (carnivorans)
Formosan black bear – Ursus thibetanus formosanus 
Formosan ferret-badger – Melogale subaurantiaca (Swinhoe)
Order Artiodactyla (even-toed ungulates)
Formosan boar – Sus scrofa taivanus
Formosan sika deer – Cervus nippon taiouanus
Taiwan serow – Naemorhedus swinhoei (Gray)
Order Eulipotyphla (shrews and kin)
Taiwanese mole shrew – Anourosorex yamashinai Kuroda
Tada's shrew – Crocidura tadae Tokuda & Kano
Formosan shrew – Episoriculus fumidus Thomas
Koshun shrew – Chodsigoa sodalis Thomas
Kano's mole – Mogera kanoana Kawada et al.
Order Rodentia (rodents)
Formosan field vole – Apodemus semotus Thomas
Spinous country-rat – Niviventer coxingi (Swinhoe)
Formosan white-bellied rat – Niviventer culturatus (Thomas)
Kikuchi's field vole – Microtus kikuchii (Kuroda)
Formosan giant flying squirrel – Petaurista grandis (Swinhoe)
Taiwan red-and-white giant flying squirrel – Petaurista lena Thomas
Order Primate (primates)
Formosan macaque – Macaca cyclopis (Swinhoe)
Order Chiroptera (bats)
Formosan long-eared bat – Plecotus taivanus Yoshiyuki
Long-toed myotis – Myotis secundus Ruedi, Csorba, Lin & Chou
Reddish myotis – Myotis soror Ruedi, Csorba, Lin & Chou
Formosan mouse-eared bat – Myotis taiwanensis Linde
Formosan broad-muzzled bat – Submyotodon latirostris Kishida
Bicolored tube-nosed bat – Murina bicolor Kuo, Fang, Csorba & Lee
Slender tube-nosed bat – Murina gracilis Kuo et al.
Formosan tube-nosed bat – Murina puta Kishida
Murina recondita Kuo, Fang, Csorba & Lee, 2009
Yellow-necked bat – Thainycteris torquatus Gabor & Lee
Formosan leaf-nosed bat – Hipposideros terasensis Kisida
Formosan greater horseshoe bat –  Rhinolophus formosae Sanborn
Formosan lesser horseshoe bat – Rhinolophus monoceros Andersen

Endemic birds

17 endemic bird species and another 60 endemic subspecies of Taiwan have been identified (out of a total of 569 bird species). The seventeen endemic species make up about 3% of all birds living in Taiwan.

Order Passeriformes (passerines and relatives)
Yellow tit – Parus holsti Seebohm
White-whiskered laughingthrush – Garrulax morrisonianus (Ogilvie-Grant)
White-eared sibia – Heterophasia auricularis (Swinhoe)
Taiwan yuhina – Yuhina brunneiceps Ogilvie-Grant
Taiwan barwing – Actinodura morrisoniana Ogilvie-Grant
Steere's liocichla – Liocichla steerii Swinhoe
Taiwan blue magpie – Urocissa caerulea (Gould)
Styan's bulbul – Pycnonotus taivanus Styan
Taiwan whistling thrush – Myophonus insularis Gould
Collared bush robin – Tarsiger johnstoniae (Ogilvie-Grant)
Flamecrest – Regulus goodfellowi Ogilvie-Grant
Taiwan bush warbler – Bradypterus alishanensis
Taiwan hwamei – Garrulax taewanus

Order Galliformes (chicken-like birds)
Taiwan hill partridge – Arborophila crudigularis (Swinhoe)
Mikado pheasant – Syrmaticus mikado (Ogilvie-Grant)
Swinhoe's pheasant – Lophura swinhoii (Gould)

Order Piciformes (woodpeckers and relatives)
Taiwan barbet – Megalaima nuchalis

Endemic reptiles
Order Squamata (lizards and snakes)
Formosan smooth skink – Scincella formosensis (Van Denburgh)
Taiwan forest skink – Sphenomorphus taiwanensis Chen & Lue
Lanyu scaly-toed gecko – Lepidodactylus yami Ota
Kikuchi's gecko – Gekko kikuchii (Oshima)
Gekko guishanicus Lin & Yao, 2016
Short-legged japalure – Diploderma brevipes Gressitt
Diploderma luei Ota, Chen & Shang, 1998
Maki's japalura – Diploderma makii Ota
Swinhoe's japalura – Diploderma swinhonis Gunther
Formosan legless lizard – Ophisaurus formosensis Kishida
Formosan grass lizard – Takydromus formosanus Boulenger
Sauteri grass lizard – Takydromus sauteri Van Denburgh
Hsuehshan grass lizard – Takydromus hsuehshanensis Lin & Cheng
Stejneger's grass lizard – Takydromus stejnegeri Van Denburgh
Hengchun blind snake – Typhlops koshunensis Oshima
Taiwan slug-eating snake – Pareas formosensis (Van Dengurgh)
Formosa odd-scaled snake – Achalinus formosanus Boulenger
Black odd-scaled snake – Achalinus niger Maki
Maki's keelback – Hebius miyajimae Maki
Swinhoe's grass snake – Rhabdophis swinhonis (Günther)
Formosa coral snake – Sinomicrurus sauteri (Steindachner)
Swinhoe's temperate Asian coralsnake – Sinomicrurus swinhoei (Van Dengurgh)
Taiwan pit viper – Trimeresurus gracilis Oshima

Endemic amphibians
Order Anura (frogs and toads)
Central Formosan toad – Bufo bankorensis
Stejneger's narrow-mouthed toad – Micryletta steinegeri
Swinhoe's brown frog — Odorrana swinhoana
Taipa frog — Rana longicrus
Sauter's brown frog — Rana sauteri
Ota's stream tree frog – Buergeria otai
Robust Buerger's frog – Buergeria robusta
Kurixalus berylliniris
Temple treefrog – Kurixalus idiootocus
Kurixalus wangi
Farmland green treefrog – Rhacophorus arvalis
Orange-belly treefrog – Rhacophorus aurantiventris
Moltrecht's green tree frog – Rhacophorus moltrechti
Emerald green treefrog – Rhacophorus prasinatus
Taipei green treefrog – Rhacophorus taipeianus
Order Urodela (salamanders and newts)
Alishan salamander – Hynobius arisanensis
Formosan salamander – Hynobius formosanus
Taiwan lesser salamander – Hynobius fuca
Nanhu salamander – Hynobius glacialis
Sonani's salamander – Hynobius sonani

Endemic freshwater fishes

Order Cypriniformes (minnows and carp)
Taitung river loach – Hemimyzon taitungensis Tzeng & Shen
Formosan river loach – Hemimyzon formosanus (Boulenger)
Shen's river loach – Hemimyzon sheni Chen & Fang
River loach – Formosania lacustris (Steindachner)
Pulin river loach – Sinogastromyzon puliensis Liang
Metzia mesembrinum (Regan)
Pararasbora moltrechti Regan
Acrossocheilus paradoxus (Günther)
Lake Candidus dace – Candidia barbata (Regan)
Microphysogobio alticorpus Banarescu & Nalbant
Taiwan ku fish – Onychostoma alticorpus (Oshima)
Freshwater minnow – Opsariichthys pachycephalus Günther
Gobiobotia cheni Banarescu & Nalbant
Microphysogobio brevirostris (Günther)
Aphyocypris kikuchii (Oshima)
Squalidus iijimae (Oshima)

Order Gobiiformes (gobies and their relatives)
Goby – Cryptocentrus yatsui Tomiyama
Goby – Myersina yangii (Chen)
Goby – Rhinogobius candidianus Regan
Goby – Rhinogobius gigas Aonuma & Chen
Goby – Rhinogobius formosanus Oshima
Goby – Rhinogobius nantaiensis Aonuma & Chen
Goby – Rhinogobius henchuenensis Chen & Shao
Goby – Rhinogobius delicatus Chen & Shao
Goby – Rhinogobius maculafasciatus Chen & Shao
Goby – Rhinogobius rubromaculatus Lee & Chang
Goby – Rhinogobius lanyuensis Chen, Miller & Fang

Order Siluriformes (catfishes)
Formosan torrent catfish – Liobagrus formosanus Regan
Bagrid catfish – Pseudobagrus adiposalis Oshima
Bagrid catfish – Pseudobagrus brevianalis Regan

Order Osmeriformes (smelts, galaxiids, and relatives)
Ariake icefish – Neosalanx acuticeps Regan (endangered)

Order Salmoniformes (salmons and trouts)
Formosan landlocked salmon – Oncorhynchus formosanus (Jordan & Oshima)

Endemic flora

Cultivated crops endemic to Taiwan:
Spodiopogon formosanus

See also
 List of protected species in Taiwan
 :Category:Endemic flora of Taiwan
 :Category:Endemic fauna of Taiwan

References

External links
Taiwan Endemic Species Research Institute
Taiwan Biodiversity National Information Network
Taiwan Ecological Research Network
Ecogrid project

Biota of Taiwan
 
Endemic